Raymond John Wiltshire (12 July 1913 – 22 July 1990) was an Australian politician.

He was born in Macedon to farmer David Bowen Wiltshire and Miriam Andrews. He was a mechanical engineer, and served in the Royal Australian Air Force from 1940 to 1945 as a fitter. On his return he ran a garage until 1949, when he became a real estate agent at Dandenong. On 26 April 1941 he married Doris Lorraine Hore; they had two children. In 1955 he was elected to the Victorian Legislative Assembly as the Liberal and Country Party member for Dandenong. He transferred to Mulgrave in 1958 and to Syndal in 1967. Wiltshire retired from politics in 1976. He died in 1990.

References

1913 births
1990 deaths
Liberal Party of Australia members of the Parliament of Victoria
Members of the Victorian Legislative Assembly
20th-century Australian politicians
Royal Australian Air Force personnel of World War II
Royal Australian Air Force airmen
Military personnel from Victoria (Australia)